This is a list of people on the postage stamps of Sri Lanka, formerly known as Ceylon.

The list is complete through 1980.

Ceylon (through 1972) 
Victoria of the United Kingdom (1857)
Edward VII of the United Kingdom (1903)
George V of the United Kingdom (1912)
George VI of the United Kingdom (1937)
D. S. Senanayake, prime minister (1949, 1966, 1968)
Elizabeth II of the United Kingdom (1953)
Sir John Kotelawala, prime minister (1956)
Hikkaduwe Sri Sumangala Thera, educator (1959)
Ratmalane Sri Dharmaloka Thera, educator (1959)
Anagarika Dharmapala, Buddhist missionary (1964)
Solomon Bandaranaike, prime minister (1961)
Henry S. Olcott, Buddhist reformer (1967)
D. B. Jayatilaka, Buddhist scholar (1968)
E. W. Perera, legislator (1969)
Alexander Ekanayake Goonesinha, trade unionist, politician (1969)
Ananda Coomaraswamy (1971)
Vladimir Lenin, Soviet leader (1971)
Cumaratunga Munidasa (1971)
Arumuga Navalar (1971)
Edward Henry Pedris, patriot (1971)
Ananda Rajakaruna (1971)
Charles Henry de Soysa, philanthropist (1971)
S. Mahinda Thero (1971)

Sri Lanka (from 1972) 
Solomon Bandaranaike, prime minister (1973, 1974)
Muhammad Lafir, billiards player (1973)
Ponnambalam Ramanathan, lawyer, educator (1975)
D.J. Wimalasurendra, engineer (1975)
Sirimavo Bandaranaike, prime minister (1976)
Alexander Graham Bell, inventor (1976)
Ponnambalam Arunachalam, educator (1977)
Thotagamuwe Sri Rahula Thera, poet (1977)
Mohammed Cassim Siddi Lebbe, lawyer, educator, journalist (1977)
Veera Puran Appu, revolutionary (1978)
Sir Ernest de Silva, Philanthropist
D. S. Senanayake, prime minister (1979)
Piyadasa Sirisena, patriot, writer (1979)
Swami Vipulananda, philosopher (1979)
Rowland Hill, postal reformer (1979)
Henry S. Olcott, Buddhist reformer (1980)
A. Ratnayake, educator (1980)
George E. de Silva, politician (1980)
H. W. Amarasuriya, politician, educationist, proprietor and philanthropist. (1983)
Dr. E.W. Adikaram, educationist, populariser of science, philosopher, and thinker. (1988)
Joseph Vaz, Indian Catholic missionary, "Apostle of Sri Lanka" (1992)
Pope John Paul II, leader of Catholic Church from 16 October 1978 - 2 April 2005 (1995)
Kithalagama Sri Seelalankara Thera, Buddhist monk (2005)
Professor Seneka Bibile, pharmacologist, politician (2006)
Sri Narayana Guru Saint, Social Reformer, Poet KERALA (2009)
ERabindranath Tagore, poet (2011)
Dudley Senanayake, politician (2011)
Eddie Jayamanne, comedian (2012)
Sandhya Kumari, actress (2012)
Titus Thotawatte, director, editor (2012)  
Joe Abeywickrama, actor (2012)
Malini Fonseka, actress (2012)
Gamini Fonseka, actor (2012)
Prof. Walpola Rahula Thero, Buddhist monk, scholar and writer (2012)
Kusuma Gunawardena, politician (2012)
Swami Vivekananda, Indian Hindu monk (2013)
Reverend Father Tissa Balasuriya, Roman Catholic priest and theologian (2013)
Alec Robertson, Buddhist preacher and lecturer (2013)
Dr. Premasiri Khemadasa, composer (2013)
Dr. Tissa Abeysekara, filmmaker (2013)
Dharmadasa Walpola, musician (2013)
Ven. Baddegama Wimalawansa Nayaka Thero, Buddhist monk (2013)

Sri Lanka
Stamps
Philately of Sri Lanka
Stamps